Marty Hoey (1951 – May 15, 1982) was a mountaineer who took part in a 1982 expedition to Mount Everest. During an attempted ascent that would have made her the first American woman to summit Everest, she plunged over the edge of the Great Couloir to her death, as the result of an unsecured climbing harness.

According to Everest expedition leader Lou Whittaker, Hoey was probably the world's best female high-altitude mountaineer at the time of her death.  She had scaled Washington's Mount Rainier over 100 times and led expeditions on Alaska's Denali.

Everest fall and aftermath
Wickwire said that Hoey leaned back to let him go ahead, and a buckle on her harness opened, releasing her from the fixed rope and sending her plunging down  into a crevasse.

Hoey's body was never recovered. Whittaker said, "I can't think of a more beautiful resting place; she fell into the prettiest place that ever was."

Whittaker cited Hoey's death as a contributing factor to the expedition's failure to summit Everest, saying: "If Marty had been with us, we would have made it."  The 16 remaining team members, all men, would make a third and final attempt, and ultimately be turned back, shy of the summit, by fierce weather.

Background
Hoey worked for Dick Bass, as safety patrol chief at the Snowbird ski resort.  She befriended him and accompanied him on his successful ascent of Mount McKinley, and he was a member of her climbing group when she perished on Mount Everest, in 1982.  When Bass eventually summitted Everest in 1985, he dedicated his ascent to her.

In context
Marty was one of ten fatalities on Everest in the 1982 climbing season, but the only American.Everest - Fatilities Some other fatalities that season were noted British climbers Peter Boardman and Joe Tasker.

See also

List of people who died climbing Mount Everest

References

1982 deaths
1951 births
Mountaineering deaths on Mount Everest